Rear Admiral Samuel Hood Inglefield CB (1783 – 24 February 1848) was a Royal Navy officer who went on to be Commander in-Chief, East Indies and China Station.

Naval career
The son of John Nicholson Inglefield, Inglefield joined the Royal Navy in 1791. He was promoted to post-captain in 1807 and commanded HMS Bacchante at Jamaica in 1807 and assisted in the capture of the Spanish privateer Amor de la Patria, and intercepted a Spanish armed vessel. The following year he captured the French brig Griffon.

By 1827 Inglefield was commanding HMS Ganges. Promoted to rear admiral in 1841, he was appointed Commander-in-Chief on the Brazils and River Plate Station at a time when Uruguayan Civil War was underway. Inglefield took decisive action at this time to keep the Paraná River open so ensuring continuity of trade. He became Commander in-Chief, East Indies and China Station in 1846 and died of apparent heat stroke while still serving in that role in 1848.

He lived at Orpington in Kent.

Family
In 1816 he married Priscilla Margaret Otway. He was father to Edward Augustus Inglefield, an admiral, inventor and Arctic explorer.

See also

References 

|-

1783 births
1848 deaths
Companions of the Order of the Bath
Samuel
Royal Navy rear admirals
Royal Navy personnel of the Napoleonic Wars